{{DISPLAYTITLE:C25H28O3}}
The molecular formula C25H28O3 (molar mass: 376.49 g/mol) may refer to:

Estradiol benzoate (EB)
Estradiol 17β-benzoate
Etofenprox

Molecular formulas